The Metcalf is an American sailboat that was designed by Bill Lapworth as a racer and first built in 1960. The boat is named for Darby Metcalf who built the first example.

Production
The design was built by W. D. Schock Corp in the United States, starting in 1960, with 450 boats completed, but it is now out of production.

Design
The Metcalf is a racing, planing, sailing dinghy, built predominantly of fiberglass, with wood trim. It has a cat rig with an anodized aluminum mast and stainless steel standing rigging. The hull has a raked stem, a plumb transom, a transom-hung rudder controlled by a tiller and a retractable daggerboard. It displaces .

See also
List of sailing boat types

References

Dinghies
1960s sailboat type designs
Sailing yachts
Sailboat type designs by Bill Lapworth
Sailboat types built by W. D. Schock Corp